Mercer Arboretum and Botanic Gardens (over 250 acres) are county botanical gardens with an arboretum and natural areas located at 22306 Aldine Westfield Road in unincorporated Harris County, Texas, United States. They are open daily with free admission.

The gardens are named after Thelma and Charles Mercer, who purchased  in the late 1940s for their home and garden. They preserved native trees such as dogwoods, cabbage palmettos, rusty blackhaw viburnum, and hawthorns, and introduced camellias and exotic tree species such as ginkgo, bauhinia, philadelphus, camphor, and tung oil.
 
The gardens include an Azalea trail, hills, a Bald Cypress Pond, a Bamboo Garden,  an Endangered Species Garden, an Herb Garden, a Hickory Bog, the Jake Roberts Maple Collection,  the Post Oak Uplands, a Prehistoric Garden, a Rock Garden, the William D. Lee Iris Collection, Perennial Gardens, a Tropical Garden, a playground, picnic tables, walking paths, and a gift shop.

See also 

 List of botanical gardens in the United States

References

External links
 Mercer Arboretum and Botanic Gardens

Arboreta in Texas
Botanical gardens in Texas
Protected areas of Harris County, Texas